Aleksandar Živković (25 December 1912 – 25 February 2000) was a Croatian footballer. Domestically, he played for Croatian clubs Concordia Zagreb and Građanski Zagreb, while abroad he played for Grasshopper Club Zürich and RCF Paris, CA Paris and FC Sochaux-Montbéliard.

Club career
He was one of the top goalscorers in the Royal Yugoslavian championship with 34 goals from 1929 to 1935,

International career
Živković was capped 15 times for the Yugoslavian national team and once for the Croatian national team in 1940.

Živković was one of seven Croatian players to boycott the Yugoslavian national team at the 1930 FIFA World Cup after the Football Association of Yugoslavia was moved from Zagreb to Belgrade. Živković made his international debut on 2 August 1931 (aged 18 years 7 months 8 days) against Czechoslovakia and scored the opening goal of a 2-1 win. Živković was the top scorer at the 1932 Balkan Cup, with five goals. He was also part of the Yugoslavia team that won the 1935 Balkan Cup, contributing with 2 goals. With 10 goals in the Balkan Cup, he is the shared third all-time top goal scorer in the competition's history, alongside Asen Panchev who also has 10, and only behind Bulgaria's Ljubomir Angelov (14) and Romania's Iuliu Bodola (15).

After retirement
During the Second World War, Živković had served as a diplomat in the Independent State of Croatia's embassies in Berlin and Budapest. In 1945, after the war, he migrated to South Africa, where he lived until 1993, when he moved back to the newly independent Republic of Croatia. He died in Zagreb in 2000, aged 87, and was interred in Mirogoj cemetery.

International goals
Yugoslavia score listed first, score column indicates score after each Živković goal.

List of international goals scored by Aleksandar Živković

Honours

International
Yugoslavia
Balkan Cup:
Champions (1): 1935
Runners-up (2): 1932 and 1933

Individual
Top goalscorer of the 1932 Balkan Cup with 5 goals

References

Sources
 Nogometni leksikon (2004, in Croatian)

External links
 

1912 births
2000 deaths
People from Orašje
People of the Independent State of Croatia
Croatian emigrants to South Africa
Association football forwards
Croatian footballers
Croatia international footballers
Yugoslav footballers
Yugoslavia international footballers
Dual internationalists (football)
HŠK Concordia players
Grasshopper Club Zürich players
HŠK Građanski Zagreb players
Racing Club de France Football players
FC Sochaux-Montbéliard players
Yugoslav First League players
Ligue 1 players
Ligue 2 players
Yugoslav expatriate footballers
Expatriate footballers in Switzerland
Yugoslav expatriate sportspeople in Switzerland
Expatriate footballers in France
Yugoslav expatriate sportspeople in France
Burials at Mirogoj Cemetery